The 2014 season was Chennaiyin FC's inaugural season in the first tournament of the newly formed Indian Super League.

Preview
Chennai city was one of the 9 cities that were selected for franchise bidding, when the ISL was founded in 2013. However, on 11 April 2014 it was reported that Chennai's main bidder, a consortium led by Sunil Gavaskar would drop out due to commitments with the Board of Control for Cricket in India. Later, Bangalore franchise was terminated after their owners dropped out following a dispute with the organizers.  Initially reports came out that the ISL organizers were looking for bidders for new owners for the Bangalore franchise before it was revealed that Ronnie Screwvala and actor Abhishek Bachchan would together bid for a Chennai team instead of a Bangalore franchise.

Players

Squad

 (Captain)

Technical staff

Indian Super League 2014

League table

Results summary

Results by matchday

Matches

Indian Super League finals

Semi-finals

References

Chennaiyin
Chennaiyin FC seasons